Grant Glacier is located in the US state of Montana in Flathead National Forest. The glacier is situated in a cirque and lies below the east slopes of Mount Grant. Images taken of the glacier in 1902 and from the same vantage point in 1998 indicate that the glacier retreated substantially during the 20th Century.

See also
List of glaciers in the United States

References

Glaciers of Flathead County, Montana
Glaciers of Montana